Below are the winners of the 2004 Billboard Latin Music Awards, handed out April 29 in Miami.

Hot Latin Song of the Year

Hot Latin Song of the Year

 "Tal Vez", - Ricky Martin

Vocal Duet or Collaboration

 "Fotografía", Juanes With Nelly Furtado

Artist of the Year

 Conjunto Primavera

People

Songwriter of the Year

 Juanes

Producer of the Year
 Rudy Perez (8 titles)

Latin Pop Albums

Male

 "Almas Del Silencio", - Ricky Martin

Female

 "Por Ti", - Ednita Nazario

Duo or Group
 
 "4", A.B. Quintanilla III Presents Kumbia Kings

New Artist

 "Corazon Latino", David Bisbal

Telemundo's Viewers Choice Awards
 David Bisbal

Top Latin Albums Artist of the Year

 Celia Cruz

Latin Rock/Alternative Album of the Year

 "Coming Up (EP)", Ozomatli

Tropical Album of the Year

Male

 "Buenos Hermanos", Ibrahim Ferrer

Female

 "Regalo Del Alma", - Celia Cruz

Duo Or Group

 "Mas Flow", Luny Tunes & Norgie Noriega

New Artist

 "Mas Flow", Luny Tunes & Noriega

Regional Mexican Airplay Song of the Year

Male Solo Artist
 "Tu Amor O Tu Desprecio", Marco Antonio Solís

Male Duo or Group

 De Durango A Chicago", Grupo Montéz de Durango

Female Group or Female Solo Artist

 "Dulce Y Salado", - Ana Gabriel

New Artist

 "Proyecto Akwid", Akwid (Univision/UG)

Latin Tour of the Year

 Luis Miguel

Other Latin

Latin Dance Club Play Track of the Year

 "Seduceme/Seduce Me Now" (Remixes), India

Latin Rap/Hip-Hop Album of the Year

 "Proyecto Akwid", Akwid

Latin Greatest Hits Album of the Year

 "Hits Mix", Celia Cruz (Sony Discos)

Latin Compilation Album of the Year

 "30 Gruperas De Coleccion", Various Artists

Latin Jazz Album of the Year

 "Trumpet Evolution", Arturo Sandoval

Latin Dance Single of the Year

 "I'm Glad" (Paul Oakenfold Remix) - Jennifer Lopez

Labels

Publisher of the Year

EMI April, ASCAP

Publishing Corporation of the Year

 EMI Music Publishing

New Categories

Latin Pop Airplay Track of the Year, Male
 "Tal Vez", Ricky Martin

Latin Pop Airplay Track of the Year, Female
 "Hoy", Gloria Estefan

Latin Pop Airplay Track of the Year, Duo or Group
 "Fotografía", Juanes With Nelly Furtado

Latin Pop Airplay Track of the Year, New Artist
 "Alucinado", Tiziano Ferro

Tropical/Salsa Airplay Track of the Year, Male
 "Si Te Dijeron", Gilberto Santa Rosa

Tropical/Salsa Airplay Track of the Year, Female
 "Seduceme", La India 
 "Dile", Ivy Queen 
 "Ríe y Llora, Celia Cruz

Tropical/Salsa Airplay Track of the Year, Duo or Group
 "Se Nos Perdio El Amor", El Gran Combo De Puerto Rico

Tropical/Salsa Airplay Track of the Year, New Artist
 "Intentalo Tu", Joe Veras 
 "12 Discípulos", Eddie Dee featuring Daddy Yankee, Ivy Queen, Tego Calderón, Voltio, Vico C, Zion, Lennox, Nicky Jam, Johnny Prez, Gallego, and Wiso G

Regional Mexican Airplay Track of the Year, Male Solo Artist
 "Quedate Callada", Jorge Luis Cabrera

Regional Mexican Airplay Track of the Year, Male Group
 "Una Vez Mas", Conjunto Primavera (Fonovisa)

Regional Mexican Airplay Track of the Year, Female Group or Female Solo Artist
 "Ay! Papacito (Uy! Daddy)", Limite (Universal Latino)

Regional Mexican Airplay Track of the Year, New Artist
 "Y Como Quieres Que Te Quiera", Fabian Gomez (Sony Discos)

Latin Christian/Gospel Album of the Year
 "Milagro", Jaci Velasquez (Sony Discos)

Billboards' "Hall of Fame Award"

 Banda El Recodo

The "Spirit of Hope" award

 Soraya

"Star Award" 

 Alejandro Fernandez

Label Awards

Hot Latin Tracks Label Of the Year
Sony

Top Latin Albums Label Of the Year
Univision Music Group

Latin Pop Airplay Label Of the Year
Sony

Tropical/Salsa Airplay Label Of the Year
Sony

Regional Mexican Airplay Label of the Year
Fonovisa

Latin Pop Albums Label Of the Year
Sony

Tropical/Salsa Albums Label Of the Year
Sony

Regional Mexican Albums Label of the Year
Univision Music Group

See also
Billboard Latin Music Awards
Billboard Music Award

References

Billboard Latin Music Awards
Latin Billboard Music Awards
Latin Billboard Music Awards
Billboard Music Awards
Latin Billboard Music